McColm Cephas (born 30 September 1978 in Monrovia) is a former Liberian soccer forward who spent five seasons in the lower U.S. divisions. He has earned two caps with the Liberia national team.

Cephas attended Virginia Commonwealth University where he played for the men's soccer team in 2002 and 2003.

He played two World Cup 2006 qualifying games for Liberia in 2004.

In 2007, Cephas signed with the Carolina RailHawks of the USL First Division. He scored only one goal in fourteen league games, but more significantly, he scored the only goal as Carolina upset the Chicago Fire, holders of the cup, in the 2007 Lamar Hunt U.S. Open Cup.

References

1978 births
Living people
Liberian footballers
Liberia international footballers
Virginia Beach Mariners players
A-League (1995–2004) players
USL First Division players
Richmond Kickers players
Richmond Kickers Future players
North Carolina FC players
Sportspeople from Monrovia
VCU Rams men's soccer players
USL League Two players
Expatriate soccer players in the United States
Association football forwards